Pramod Ratan Patil (born 1973), commonly known as Raju Patil, is an Indian politician and leader of Maharashtra Navnirman Sena in the Kalyan-Dombivli region.  He is a supporter of MNS Chief Raj Thackeray. He played a major role in the Kalyan-Dombivli Municipal Corporation (KDMC) election in 2010 where the MNS won 29 seats. He was a Member of Thane Zilha Parishad from 2009 to 2012. In the 2019 Maharashtra Legislative Assembly election he was elected to the Kalyan Rural seat.

Early life  
His father, Ratanbuva Patil, was a senior Labour leader in Premier Company. His elder brother Ramesh was a member of the Maharashtra Pradesh Congress Committee until 2009 when he switched allegiance to MNS, convincing Raju to join him in active politics. His brother resigned as a member of Thane ZP and contested the Vidhansabha election from Kalyan Rural constituency from MNS. Raju contested the same Thane Zilha Parishad seat and was elected unopposed.

Political life  
Thane Zilha Parishad Member, Raj Thackeray appointed Patil as secretary of the MNS Labour union. After the success of the KDMC election the party gave him Marathwada Samparkpramukh responsibility.

References

External links  
 Profile On Vidhan sabha
 Pramod Ratan Patil on Facebook
 Pramod Ratan Patil on Instagram
 Pramod Ratan Patil On Twitter
 Pramod Ratan Patil On YouTube
 

Maharashtra politicians
Maharashtra Navnirman Sena
Maharashtra Navnirman Sena politicians
Indian Hindus
1973 births
Living people